The Changan CS55 is a compact crossover SUV produced by the Chinese manufacturer Changan Automobile under the Changan marque since 2017. It debuted on the 2017 Shanghai Auto Show and was launched on the Chinese auto market later in 2017. The manufacturer announced a full-electric version on 9 July 2020 called the CS55 EV. A facelift in 2019 updated the name to Changan CS55 Plus, and the second generation Changan CS55 Plus was introduced in March 2021. 



First generation

The first generation Changan CS55 is a compact crossover SUV produced by Changan Automobile, and was launched at the 2017 Shanghai Auto Show. Pricing for the CS55 ranges from 74,900 yuan to 86,900 yuan, slotting the five-seat CS55 below the similarly sized Changan CS75. 

The Changan CS55 is powered by a 1.5 liter turbocharged inline-4 petrol engine with variable valve timing on both inlet and exhaust camshafts producing 156bhp and 225nm (165lb ft) mated to a 6-speed manual transmission or 6-speed automatic transmission by Aisin Warner. 

The suspension features struts at the front, a multi-link axle at the rear, and anti-roll bars front and rear. It is equipped with electric power steering and the brakes are vented discs at the front and solid at the rear. A subframe carries the powertrain and front suspension.

The styling was developed by Changan’s Turin design studio. However, the CUV was controversial styling wise as the CS55 was criticized for resembling the Land Rover Discovery Sport.

2018 facelift
A facelift was launched in 2018 changing mainly the front bumper and grilles. 55 Changan CS55 were used to break Guinness World Records of Largest parade of autonomous cars.

Changan CS55 Plus
Another facelift was launched in 2019 dubbed the Changan CS55 Plus, featuring completely restyled front and rear designs including a restyled front grille similar to the Changan CS75 Plus and connected tail lamps. The CS55 Plus is powered by a 1.5 liter turbo inline-4 engine producing 180Ps (132kW) and 300N.m, mated to a 7-speed DCT.

CS55 EV
On 15th July 2020, Changan brought a full electric version to market. The model is based on the petrol-powered CS55 Plus and was originally called the CS55 E-Rock before changing to CS55 EV prior to market launch. It has an output of 160 kW and a torque of 300 Nm. In terms of battery capacity, there is a choice between a version with 52.7 kWh and 84.2 kWh, which should enable a range of 403 and 605 km according to NEDC. In fast charging mode, the charging time from 30 to 80 % will be 35 minutes.

Second generation (Changan CS55 Plus II)

News of the second generation Changan CS55 Plus surfaced in March 2021. The second generation model features exterior design language previously introduced by the Changan UNI-T and Changan UNI-K. The engine of the second generation Changan CS55 Plus continues to be the NE series Changan Blue Whale 1.5 liter turbo engine, developing 188hp and mated to a wet style 7-speed dual-clutch transmission.

References

External links

 

CS55
Compact sport utility vehicles
Cars of China
Cars introduced in 2017
Production electric cars